Yuri Pavlovich Rachmaninov (20 July 1936 – 18 June 2007) was a Soviet and Russian scientist and engineer.  He was the great-nephew of Russian composer Sergei Rachmaninoff.

1936 births
2007 deaths
Scientists from Moscow
Heroes of Socialist Labour
Recipients of the Order "For Merit to the Fatherland", 2nd class
Recipients of the Order "For Merit to the Fatherland", 3rd class
Recipients of the Order of Courage
Recipients of the Order of Lenin
Soviet scientists
Moscow Metro
Soviet engineers
20th-century Russian engineers
Burials in Troyekurovskoye Cemetery